Plague Ship is the fifth installment of The Oregon Files by Clive Cussler and Jack Du Brul. It recounts a series of violent viral attacks on cruise ships by extremists who want to make half the world's population sterile. The group, named "The Responsivists", is a thinly disguised cover for "Scientologists".

Plot 

The crew of the Oregon has just completed a top secret mission against Iran to steal a rocket torpedo that was illegally sold to them by the Russian Federation, when they come across a cruise ship named the Golden Dawn adrift at sea. The passengers and crew were killed by a hemorrhagic fever, similar to Ebola. The Golden Dawn is similar to the Emerald Dolphin that appears in Valhalla Rising (novel), a book in Cussler's Dirk Pitt series

As Captain and Corporation leader Juan Cabrillo tries to determine what happened, explosions wrack the length of the ship. Barely able to escape with his own life and that of the liner's sole survivor, Jannike Dahl, Cabrillo finds himself plunged into a mystery as intricate and perilous as any he has ever known.  He'll be pitted against a cult with monstrously lethal plans for the human race - plans he may already be too late to stop.

2008 American novels
Novels by Clive Cussler
Novels by Jack Du Brul
G. P. Putnam's Sons books
The Oregon Files
Collaborative novels